E. Gutzwiller & Cie. Banquiers is one of the oldest Swiss banks located in Basel. It is a private bank specializing in asset management. It was founded in 1886 by Carl Gutzwiller and is a founding member of the Basel Stock Exchange. Today the bank is largely in the hands of the Gutzwiller family. The bank is managed by four fully liable partners: 
François Gutzwiller
Stéphane Gutzwiller
Prince Lorenz of Belgium
Peter Handschin.

Gutzwiller has representations in Geneva (Gutzwiller SA) and since 2004 also in Zurich (Gutzwiller Partner AG). The bank specializes in the asset management and investment advisory for private clients. Gutzwiller also offers investment funds via its subsidiary Gutzwiller Fonds Management AG.

The family business is now in 4th generation and employs about 60 people.

References 

Article contains translated text from E. Gutzwiller & Cie. Banquiers on the German Wikipedia retrieved on 10 March 2017.

External links 

Homepage

Banks of Switzerland
Banks established in 1886
Swiss companies established in 1886
Companies based in Basel